Elizabeth Holzhall Richard is an American diplomat who served as United States ambassador to Lebanon from 2016 to 2020. She is the nominee to serve as coordinator for counterterrorism in the Biden administration.

Early life and education
Richard is the daughter of Vern F. Holzhall and Mary V. Holzhall. She earned a Bachelor of Arts degree from Southern Methodist University, a Juris Doctor from the Dedman School of Law, and a Master of Science from the National War College.

Career
Richard joined the Foreign Service in 1986. Her early career included assignments in Ecuador, Italy, Singapore, and Thailand. From 2002 to 2003 she was special assistant to the under secretary of state for political affairs. She then served two years as deputy to the U.S. ambassador at-large for war crimes issues. In 2005 she became deputy director of the Office of Asia, Africa, and Europe in the Bureau of International Narcotics and Law Enforcement and a year later became director for Counter-Narcotics, Law Enforcement, and Rule of Law Programs in Kabul, Afghanistan. From 2008 to 2010 she served in Islamabad, Pakistan and from 2010 to 2013 she was deputy chief of mission in Yemen.

When selected by President Barack Obama for an ambassador role, Richard was deputy assistant secretary in the Bureau of Near Eastern Affairs, a role she had held since 2013. She was confirmed by the Senate on May 17, 2016.

Ambassador for Counterterrorism
Richard is the nominee to serve as coordinator for counterterrorism in the Biden administration. Hearings on her nomination were held before the Senate Foreign Relations Committee on May 10, 2022. The committee favorably reported her nomination to the Senate floor on June 9, 2022. Richard's nomination is currently pending before the full United States Senate.

Personal life
Richard is the widow of Christopher John Richard. She speaks Italian, Spanish, and French.

References

External links

Living people
Ambassadors of the United States to Lebanon
National War College alumni
Obama administration personnel
Southern Methodist University alumni
United States Foreign Service personnel
Dedman School of Law alumni
Year of birth missing (living people)
21st-century American diplomats
American women ambassadors
21st-century American women
Biden administration personnel
American women diplomats
American diplomats